Pečke ( or) is a village in the Municipality of Makole in northeastern Slovenia. It lies in the lower valley of Ložnica Creek, just before its confluence with the Dravinja River. It includes the hamlets of Spodnje Pečke, Sredce, and Zgornje Pečke. The area is part of the traditional region of Styria. It is now included with the rest of the municipality in the Drava Statistical Region.

References

External links
Pečke at Geopedia

Populated places in the Municipality of Makole